was an officer and ace fighter pilot in the Imperial Japanese Navy (IJN) during the Second Sino-Japanese War and the Pacific theater of World War II. Graduating from Kasumigaura Naval Air Group in November 1934, Hidaka joined the first division, the 15th Air Group bound to Hankou as a Petty Officer, 3rd Class on November 1, 1937 bound to Hankou with the flight time of 1,040 hours. During May and July 1943, Hidaka was stationed at Truk Island and often flew to Rabaul airfield on New Britain.

In aerial combat over China and the Pacific, he was officially credited with destroying 11 enemy aircraft. Hidaka survived World War II.

Notes

References

1915 births
Year of death missing
Japanese naval aviators
Japanese World War II flying aces
Military personnel from Kagoshima Prefecture
Imperial Japanese Navy officers